Stefan Locher (born 11 January 1968) is a German lightweight rower. He won a gold medal at the 1996 World Rowing Championships in Motherwell with the lightweight men's eight.

References

1968 births
Living people
German male rowers
World Rowing Championships medalists for Germany
Olympic rowers of Germany
Rowers at the 2004 Summer Olympics